Bayangol is a rural locality (an ulus) in Barguzinsky District, Republic of Buryatia, Russia. The population was 1,351 as of 2010. There are 16 streets.

Geography 
Bayangol is located 65 km northeast of Barguzin (the district's administrative centre) by road. Yubileyny is the nearest rural locality.

References 

Rural localities in Barguzinsky District